J.F.K. Assassination: A Visual Investigation is an educational interactive CD-ROM.

Development
J.F.K. Assassination: A Visual Investigation is an educational interactive CD-ROM conceived by Raphael Laderman and developed by his company Kozel Multimedia.

Reception
The game was nominated for two awards at the Digital Hollywood Awards for Best Reference CD - Journalism or General interest, and Best CD-ROM.

The editors of Electronic Entertainment presented J.F.K Assassination with their 1993 "Best Multimedia Title" award, and wrote that it "brilliantly employs multimedia technology to let you conduct your own investigation".

Legacy
It was followed by a CD-ROM entitled Serial Killer (aka Mind of a Killer), which examined famous cases of serial killers.

References

1993 video games
Educational video games
Interactive media
Classic Mac OS games
Video games developed in the United States
Windows games
Video games based on the assassination of John F. Kennedy